Yorsh, also known as mora grogg, is a Russian mixed drink consisting of beer thoroughly mixed with an ample quantity of vodka. It is traditionally drunk in a social setting, typically with a toast followed by downing a full glass of it at one go. It is commonly consumed in Russia.

Vodka is a neutral spirit which does not greatly alter the flavor of the beer, but does greatly increase its alcohol content.

Probably the first evidence of presence of such a mix in Russian drinking culture is the Tale of Woe and Misfortune, an anonymous 17th-century poem. The early version of yorsh described there included bread wine, however.

See also

 Boilermaker (beer cocktail)
 Somaek
 U-Boot (beer cocktail)
 List of cocktails
 Bomb shot

References

External links

Cocktails with beer
Cocktails with vodka